Stephen McKenna is an Irish professional boxer. As an amateur he won a gold medal at the 2015 Commonwealth Youth Games and silver at the European Youth Championships in the same year.

Amateur career
As an amateur McKenna compiled a record of 155–24. In 2015 he won gold medals at the Irish National Championships and Commonwealth Youth Games, and silver at the European Youth Championships, all in the light-flyweight division. In 2017 he moved up to the bantamweight division, winning a silver medal at the Irish National Championships.

Professional career
After signing a promotional contract with Oscar De La Hoya's Golden Boy Promotions, Mckenna made his professional debut on 6 April 2019 against Trey Branch at the Pico Rivera Sports Arena in Pico Rivera, California. McKenna forced his opponent to the canvas with a barrage of punches in the first round. Branch made it to his feet before the referee's count of ten, only to be stunned by a left hand. McKenna followed up with a four punch combination, prompting the referee to call a halt to the contest to award McKenna a first-round knockout (KO) victory.

He secured three more wins in 2019; first-round KOs against Keasen Freeman in June and Keahola Helm in August; and a second-round KO against Gonzalo Dallera in November.

McKenna's first fight of 2020 was his first in Europe, scoring a first-round KO against Gary McGuire in September at the Production Park Studios in South Kirkby, England.

Professional boxing record

References

External links

Living people
Date of birth missing (living people)
Year of birth missing (living people)
Irish male boxers
Light-flyweight boxers
Bantamweight boxers
Light-welterweight boxers